Thelma, Louise et Chantal is a 2010 French comedy film directed by .  The film premiered at the 2010 L'Alpe d'Huez Film Festival.

Plot 
Gabrielle, Nelly and Chantal are three girlfriends. They decide to travel together to the wedding of their ex at La Rochelle. During this trip, they share their blows of heart and rants.

Cast 
 Jane Birkin as Nelly
 Caroline Cellier as Gabrielle
 Catherine Jacob as Chantal
 Thierry Lhermitte as Phillipe
 Michèle Bernier as The bride
 Alysson Paradis as Elisa
 Sébastien Huberdeau as Mathieu
 Micheline Presle as Huguette
 Joséphine de Meaux as Sophie
 Arié Elmaleh as Nicolas
  as Hugo
 Stéphane Metzger as Bruno
 Nicolas Schweri as Clément
 Jean-Pierre Martins as the mechanic
 Eriq Ebouaney as the realtor
 Brice Fournier as Patrick
 Adeline Giroudon as Nadège
 Julie Meunier as Chloé

References

External links 

2010 films
2010 comedy films
French comedy films
2010s French films
2010s French-language films